New Zealand Knights Football Club was a New Zealand professional football club based in Auckland. The club was formed in 2004, and played their first competitive match in July 2005 when they participated in the 2005 A-League Pre-Season Challenge Cup. The club played its home matches at North Harbour Stadium. The Knights was dissolved in 2007, following two seasons of football.

New Zealand Knights' record appearance-maker was Darren Bazeley, with 47 appearances over 2 seasons, ahead of Noah Hickey with 43.

List of players
 Appearances and goals are for first-team competitive matches only, including A-League and Pre-Season Challenge Cup matches.
 Players are listed according to the date of their first team debut for the club.

Table headers
 Nationality – If a player played international football, the country/countries he played for are shown. Otherwise, the player's nationality is given as their country of birth.
 New Zealand Knights career – The year of the player's first appearance for New Zealand Knights to the year of his last appearance.
 Starts – The number of games started.
 Sub – The number of games played as a substitute.
 Total – The total number of games played, both as a starter and as a substitute.

Club captains
Two players held the position of captain of the New Zealand Knights between 2005 and 2007. The first club captain was Danny Hay, who led the side in 2005. The longest-serving captain was Darren Bazeley, who was captain from 2005 to 2007 after taking over from Hay.

Notes
 A utility player is one who is considered to play in more than one position.

References

 
New Zealand Knights FC
Association football player non-biographical articles